Saxophone Concerto may refer to:

 Saxophone Concerto (Adams)
 Saxophone Concerto (Glazunov)
 Saxophone Concerto (Higdon)